Hettie Dyhrenfurth (1892–1972) was a German-Swiss mountaineer. She took part in two major expeditions to the Himalayas in 1930 and 1934. Hettie and her husband Gunter Dyhrenfurth won the Olympic alpinism gold medal at the 1936 Berlin Olympics.

Early life
Harriet Pauline (Hettie) Heymann was born in Wroclaw in 1892 to an industrialist family. Dyhrenfurth's family was of partial Jewish origin. She married Gunter Dyhrenfurth and from 1913 to 1918 had three children. The family spent time living in Austria and Switzerland.

Climbing career
Dyhrenfurth's husband was passionate about mountaineering and when he began to organize expeditions to the Himalayas, Dyhrenfurth accompanied him.
Dyhrenfurth participated in the 1930 International Himalayan Expedition to Kangchenjunga, as the only European woman on the team. Dyhrenfurth managed luggage transport and supplies for the group. The team failed to ascend the Kangchenjunga peak but explored other mountains in the area. She published a book about her experiences on the expedition called Memsahb im Himalaja (Memsahb in the Himalayas).

Together with her husband Gunther, Dyhrenfurth was awarded the 1936 Olympic gold medal in alpinism, the third and final time the award was offered. The award was given in recognition of the couple's achievements during their 1934 expedition to the upper Baltoro glacier in the Karakoram, where they made the first ascents of all four summits of the Sia Kangri mountain. During this expedition, Dyhrenfurth set the women's altitude record of 7,315 meters that would remain in place for 20 years.

Personal life
In the 1930s, Dyhrenfurth emigrated from Switzerland to the United States. In the U.S., Dyhrenfurth gave lectures about her mountaineering experience to various audiences, including the American Geographical Society. Dyhrenfurth and her husband divorced in 1948.

Dyhrenfurth's son Norman Dyhrenfurth was a mountaineer who led the first successful U.S. expedition to the summit of Mount Everest in 1963.

Dyhrenfurth died in 1972.

In film 
The Throne of the Gods - 1933 documentary about the Dyhrenfurth group's summit of Jongsong
To The Third Pole (Zum Dritten Pol) - 2008 German documentary about the Dyhrenfurth family directed by Juergen Czwienk & Andreas Nickel

References 

German mountain climbers
Swiss mountain climbers
Female climbers
1892 births
1972 deaths
Swiss emigrants to the United States